Mostel is a surname. Notable people with the surname include:

Josh Mostel (born 1946), American actor, son of Zero
Zero Mostel (1915–1977), American actor, singer, and comedian

See also
Mosel (surname)